Joseph Appiah Boateng (affectionately known as JAB1) is a Ghanaian politician and member of the National Democratic Congress. He is the member of parliament for Afram Plains South in the Eastern Region of Ghana.

Early life and education 
Joseph was born on 4 August 1975 in Obo-Kwahu in the Eastern region. He had Diploma in Nursing at the Australia Nursing College in 2008–2011 in Paramatta. He also had his Post-Graduate in Strategic Management in 2020.

Politics 
He is a member of National Democratic Congress. He was a committee member of Selection, Lands and Forestry. In 2016, Joseph opted out of the parliamentary race after a court granted a motion by Dickson Adjei Danso that he should be prevented due to a criminal case against Joseph.

2012 election 
In the 2012 Ghanaian general election, he won the Afram Plains South Constituency parliamentary seat with 14,946 votes making 61.46% of the total votes cast whilst the NPP parliamentary candidate Adongo Anthony had 7,348 votes making 30.22% of the total votes cast, an Independent parliamentary candidate Ahaligah Rapahel Kofi had 1,814 votes making 7.46% of the total votes cast and the CPP parliamentary candidate Darfour Janet had 209 votes making 0.86% of the total votes cast.

2020 election 
In the 2020 Ghanaian general election, he won the Afram Plains South Constituency parliamentary seat with 18,246 votes making 66.24% of the total votes cast whilst the NPP parliamentary candidate Willie Horr had 9,300 votes making 33.76% of the total votes cast.

Committees 
He is a member of the Government Assurance Committee and also a member of the Environment, Science and Technology Committee.

Employment 
Joseph is a development worker/architect/quantity surveyor. He was the CEO of Twenties Jog Company Limited in Sowutuom, Accra. He was the sales manager for Twimbros Enterprise from 1996 to 2007. He also worked at Regis Care as a Nurse from 2008 to 2011.

Personal life 
Joseph is married with three children. He is a Christian (Church of Pentecost)

Philanthropy 
He has embarked on projects such as schools, provision of street lights and boreholes.

Controversy 
It was alleged he was deported from Ghana, later joined the National Democratic Congress and represented the Afram Plains South Constituency in Parliament in 2012. It was alleged he committed crimes in New Zealand and Australia. On 8 December 2017, he was cleared of any wrongdoing as there were not adequate evidence to back the allegation.

References 

Living people
1975 births
Ghanaian Pentecostals
Ghanaian chief executives
National Democratic Congress (Ghana) politicians
Ghanaian MPs 2017–2021
Ghanaian business executives